Zachary Andrew Knighton (born October 25, 1978) is an American actor, most widely known for starring as Dave Rose on the ABC comedy series Happy Endings. Prior to that, he co-starred as Dr. Bryce Varley on ABC's science fiction series FlashForward. He also starred in the FOX sitcom Weird Loners and stars as Orville "Rick" Wright in the CBS/[NBC]] drama series Magnum P.I.

Life and career
Knighton was born in Alexandria, Virginia and, in 1996, graduated from Frank W. Cox High School in Virginia Beach, Virginia and the Governor's School for the Arts. Later, he attended Virginia Commonwealth University.

In 2007, he starred in the horror film remake The Hitcher, with Sophia Bush, playing the role originally performed by C. Thomas Howell. Previously, Knighton played Laz Lackerson on the short-lived television program, Life on a Stick. He starred as Gary on the series Related.

In 2009, he was cast as Bryce Varley in the science fiction series FlashForward, based on the novel by Robert J. Sawyer. Knighton had originally auditioned for the role of Demetri Noh but lost out to John Cho. The show's co-creator David S. Goyer then rewrote the role of Bryce Varley for Knighton. The show was axed after one season.

From April 2011 to May 2013, Knighton starred as Dave Rose on the ABC comedy series Happy Endings, alongside Eliza Coupe, Elisha Cuthbert, Adam Pally, Damon Wayans Jr. and Casey Wilson. Despite critical acclaim and a cult following, the show was cancelled by ABC after concluding its third season on May 3, 2013. BuddyTV ranked him #94 on its list of "TV's Sexiest Men of 2011" and #100 in "TV's Sexiest Men of 2012".

In 2014, Knighton appeared in a recurring guest arc in the 5th season of the NBC series Parenthood. He also starred on the FOX sitcom Weird Loners.

In 2018, Knighton was cast in the recurring role of Paul on the second season of the Netflix horror-comedy series Santa Clarita Diet. In 2018, Knighton was cast in the main role of Rick Wright on the CBS drama series Magnum P.I.. The series was canceled after four seasons on CBS, but he is set to continue in the role following the series's pickup by NBC in 2022.

Filmography

Film

Television

References

External links

1978 births 
20th-century American male actors
21st-century American male actors
American male film actors
American male television actors
Living people
Male actors from Alexandria, Virginia
People from Virginia Beach, Virginia
Virginia Commonwealth University alumni